Gaelic script may refer to:
Insular script used in Ireland
Gaelic type, based on Insular script